Dakha Devi Rasiwasia College, established in 1971, is a major and general degree college situated at Chabua, Dibrugarh district, Assam. This college is affiliated with the Dibrugarh University.

Departments

Arts
Assamese
English
History
Education
Economics
Philosophy
Political Science
Sociology
Commerce

References

External links
http://ddrcollege.in/

Universities and colleges in Assam
Colleges affiliated to Dibrugarh University
Educational institutions established in 1971
1971 establishments in Assam